Chubukaran (Sıbıqaran) is a rural locality (a village) in Slakbashevsky Selsoviet, Belebeyevsky District, Bashkortostan, Russia. The population was 25 as of 2010.

Geography 
It is located 35 km from Belebey and 10 km from Slakbash.

References 

Rural localities in Belebeyevsky District